Angelina Marie Pivarnick (born June 26, 1986) is an American reality television personality who is best known for starring in the first two seasons of the MTV reality show Jersey Shore and its spin-off, Jersey Shore: Family Vacation. Pivarnick also appeared on the VH1 show Couples Therapy in 2012.

Early life
Pivarnick was born and raised in Staten Island, New York. She has two sisters. She graduated from Susan E. Wagner High School.

Career 
Before she joined the cast of Jersey Shore, Pivarnick worked as a waitress. Jersey Shore premiered on December 4, 2009. She was evicted from the shore house in the third episode of season one, after refusing to work her shift at the T-shirt shop. She then was on Jersey Shore season two in Miami Beach, Florida and Pivarnick again departed the house during season two after violent confrontations with fellow cast-members Michael Sorrentino and Nicole "Snooki" Polizzi. She did not return for season three. Pivarnick made guest appearances during the fifth and sixth seasons.

In 2010, Pivarnick released the song "I'm Hot". She and her boyfriend appeared in Season 1 of the VH1 reality show Couples Therapy, which premiered March 25, 2012.

In March 2011, Pivarnick appeared on the professional wrestling promotion Total Nonstop Action Wrestling, competing in a six-person tag team match.

In 2011, Pivarnick made a brief appearance in the music video for rap group Dacav5's song "Dirty Style". She also appeared as a contestant on the reality dating series Excused. She made it to the final round and was chosen by Sergio to try dating each other. She later released a new song, "Gotta Go Out", under the name Miss AP in August 2011, featuring Tony Hanson "Fenix". The song charted at No. 37 in the United States on the Billboard Dance/Club Play Songs list.

In September 2012, she engaged in a debate with recording artist Adam Barta on the topic of gay marriage, which she said she opposed. She later reversed her position after Jersey Shore co-star JWoww criticized her on Twitter, and issued a public apology via TMZ. In December, Pivarnick announced a single release called "Serendipity" with Barta, in the hopes of making amends with the LGBT community.

In 2018, Pivarnick and fiancé Chris Larangeira appeared on the show How Far Is Tattoo Far?

In 2019, Pivarnick made a guest appearance on Double Shot at Love.

After joining Jersey Shore: Family Vacation in 2018 as a recurring guest, Pivarnick later became a full-time cast member in 2019.

Personal life
On January 12, 2018, Pivarnick became engaged to Chris Larangeira after a year of dating. They married on November 20, 2019. In February 2022, Larangeira filed for divorce after two years of marriage citing irreconcilable differences.

Pivarnick is a registered emergency medical technician and worked for the FDNY in Staten Island. In 2020, she settled a lawsuit against a lieutenant of hers whom she accused of sexual harassment.

Filmography

References

External links 
 
 

1986 births
American female professional wrestlers
American people of Italian descent
American people of Polish descent
Living people
Participants in American reality television series
People from Staten Island
Professional wrestlers from New York (state)
Professional wrestlers from New York City
21st-century professional wrestlers